Derryn Nigel Hinch (born 9 February 1944) is a New Zealand-born media personality, politician, actor, journalist and published author. He is best known for his career in Australia, on Melbourne radio and television. He served as a Senator for Victoria from 2016 to 2019.

Hinch was elected to the Senate representing Victoria as the head of Derryn Hinch's Justice Party at the 2016 federal election. Aged 72 at the time, Hinch was, when elected, the oldest federal parliamentarian ever to be elected for the first time. He lost his senate seat in the 2019 election.

He remained host of his weekly program Hinch Live until the election campaign period officially commenced, in a decision supported by Sky News Live. He has been the host of 3AW's Drive radio show, and a National Public Affairs commentator for the Seven Network on Sunday Night, Today Tonight and Sunrise.

Hinch has been convicted of contempt of court three times, serving two prison sentences and one sentence of house detention.

Career

Print
Hinch began his career at the age of 15 with the Taranaki Herald in New Plymouth, New Zealand in 1960. In 1963, he came to Australia on the MS Wanganella and joined The Sun in Sydney. By 1966 he had become a foreign correspondent for the Fairfax organisation, and in New York became bureau chief in 1972. He remained living in New York for 11 years. Hinch returned to Sydney and was editor of The Sun in 1976–1977.

Television 
Hinch hosted Beauty and the Beast on the Seven Network between 1982 and 1983. From 1987 to 1991, Hinch hosted his own current affairs show on the Seven Network titled Hinch, which later moved to Network Ten where it ran from 1992–1994. In 1994, Hinch joined the Nine Network and hosted The Midday Show for a year. He has also appeared on Dancing with the Stars, Underbelly and Millionaire Hot Seat as a guest playing for charity.

In September 2012, Hinch rejoined the Seven Network as national public affairs commentator, though there were rumours that Hinch might make a comeback (although this never eventuated). From February 2015, Hinch hosted a twice weekly news opinion program, Hinch Live, over the weekend on Sky News Australia.

Hinch, Seven Network 1987–1991, then 1992–1994, Network Ten
Beauty and the Beast, Seven Network (1982–1983)
The Midday Show, Nine Network (1994)
Mars Venus, Foxtel (2003)
Dancing with the Stars, Seven Network (2005)
Underbelly, Nine Network (2008)
Seven News, Sunrise & Sunday Night National Public Affairs Commentator, Seven Network (2012–)
Hinch Live, Sky News Australia (2015-2016)

Radio
In 1978, Hinch had a morning program on 3XY. He made the move to 3AW in 1979, hosting the morning shift to high ratings, staying until 1987, when he left to return to television as host of Hinch At Seven.

During the 1990s he had a brief stint presenting talkback on Adelaide station 5DN, before returning to 3AW in 2000 to host Nightline. In 2001, he began a two-year stint at 3AK before returning to 3AW to host the drive-time program in 2003.  He was often absent from the programs due to suspension, poor health and house arrest. In August 2012, it was announced Hinch's contract would not be renewed by 3AW, and he would be replaced by financial commentator Tom Elliott. He is the Melbourne correspondent for New Zealand radio network Newstalk ZB and often presents political commentaries on the station.

Acting
In September 2008, Hinch had a four-week run as The Criminologist (narrator) in the Australian tour of The Rocky Horror Show. He also appeared as himself, in a minor role, in the 2000 film The Wog Boy with Nick Giannopoulos, and reprised the role in its 2022 sequel, Wog Boys Forever. Hinch also made cameo appearances on Fast Forward, which was the same sketch show where he was parodied as Hunch, played by Steve Vizard. Hinch played the role of Senator in 2016 movie The Colour of Darkness.

Politics
In 2015, Hinch established Derryn Hinch's Justice Party, and was subsequently elected to the Australian Senate as senator for Victoria at the 2016 double dissolution election on 2 July 2016. He became the oldest person ever newly elected to the Australian parliament. His party's main emphasis is on criminal justice reform, including tougher sentences for violent and sexual offenders, no bail for those accused of a serious violent offence, parole reform, and a public register of sex offenders. Other positions include equal rights for all citizens regardless of race, religion or sexual orientation, tougher laws against animal cruelty, and support for voluntary euthanasia. Following the announcement of the 2016 Senate election results, other Senators negotiated, against Hinch's objections, to allocate him a three-year rather than a six-year Senate term.

In August 2017, it was revealed that Hinch holds an American Social Security number, raising concerns during the dual citizenship crisis that he may be disqualified from office under Section 44 of the Constitution of Australia. However, in September 2017, the Attorney-General made the decision not to refer him to the High Court.

Hinch has shown support for capital punishment.

In the 2019 elections, Hinch lost his seat in the Senate. Hinch was seeking re-election after three years. This has left his party unrepresented in the Australian federal parliament, although it retains two seats in the Victorian Legislative Council. The constituencies represented being Western Victoria and Northern Victoria.

Hinch most recently contested the 2022 Victorian state election for the South-Eastern Metropolitan Region but was unsuccessful. 

Hinch Opposes the Voice to parliament.

Controversies

Michael Glennon
In 1985, Hinch found that Michael Glennon, who had previously been convicted on a charge of indecent assault with a minor, was to be tried on new charges while still running a youth camp. Hinch, who says he was concerned that parents were unknowingly sending their children to Glennon's camp, first appealed privately to then Victorian Premier John Cain and the then-Attorney-General, as well as the head of the Roman Catholic Church in Australia, but in Hinch's words, they "washed their hands" of the situation. Subsequently, Hinch publicly identified Glennon during his trial on the third set of charges, in spite of the strong sub judice rule under Australian jurisprudence. This delayed the trial while Hinch was tried on contempt of court charges; Hinch was fined $10,000 and imprisoned for twelve days. This was the first time anyone had gone to prison on a prior restraint issue in Australia. Hinch appealed his case as far as the High Court of Australia, which affirmed his conviction. In its ruling the Court held that despite Hinch's motivation of warning the public that Glennon continued to hold a position in a youth organisation, it was sufficient to inform them of the current charges against him, and that the information about his prior conviction was prejudicial under Australian law. Hinch called the incident "the thing I'm most proud of in my life."

Mick Gatto's call
On 24 June 2008, while Hinch was discussing the celebrity status of underworld crime figures during his drive program, Mick Gatto phoned in and had a brief confrontation with Hinch, ending with a death threat.

John Laws
On 30 July 2007, John Laws and Hinch attended the 40 Years of Radio Legends, after which Hinch complained the "event had been turned into a tribute to Laws", among other comments which caused ill feeling between the two.

On 5 December 2007, Hinch was abused verbally with obscenities by John Laws while dining at lunch with 2CH personality Bob Rogers in a restaurant at the Finger Wharf in Woolloomooloo, Sydney.

Sexual relationship with teenager
In his 2004 book The Fall and Rise of Derryn Hinch, and in a radio editorial in March 2005, Hinch admitted to having sex with a 15-year-old female when he was in his early thirties, although he stated he "thought she was about 25". Following his on-air admission, Herald Sun journalist Andrew Bolt called for his prosecution. In 2013, Hinch wrote that after 30 years the woman had contacted him and said he was wrong about her age. She said she was born in 1961 and they met shortly after he joined 3AW in 1979. That made her 17 at the time of the liaison (which is above the age of consent in Australia). The ABC journalist James Purtill article on 6 July 2016 mentions only one (of the two) published self-admissions.

Criminal convictions

1987 conviction and imprisonment
Hinch served 12 days in prison and was fined 15,000 in 1987 for contempt of court after he publicly revealed paedophile Roman Catholic priest Michael Charles Glennon's prior conviction while a trial was still pending.

2011 conviction and home detention
In June 2011, he was convicted of breaching suppression orders against the names of two sex offenders, and was subsequently sentenced to five months' home detention.

2014 conviction and imprisonment
In October 2013, Hinch was found guilty of contempt of court for breaching a suppression order by revealing details of the criminal history of Jill Meagher's killer, Adrian Ernest Bayley. The judge gave Hinch 90 days to pay the fine, or else face 50 days in prison. On 16 January 2014, one day prior to the expiration of the 90-day period, Hinch advised that he would not pay the fine 'on principle'. He was imprisoned on 17 January 2014. On 7 March 2014, he was released from prison after 50 days, having served his full sentence. He was greeted by his partner Natasha Chadwick, other friends and a substantial media contingent.

Personal life
Hinch has been married five times. His first marriage was to Lana Wells, an editor. His second marriage was to Eve Carpenter, a flight attendant. He then married Australian actress Jacki Weaver. They were married in 1983 and remained so for 13 years before divorcing in 1996.  It has been widely reported that they remarried in 1997 before divorcing again in 1998, however Weaver has denied that any such second marriage ever took place. He married Chanel Hayton in February 2006 and they separated in late 2012. His most recent publicised relationship was with Natasha Chadwick, a former detective sergeant with NSW Police and freelance journalist.

In March 2017, Hinch told the New Zealand Herald that he had been molested by a brother of one of his father's friends as a nine-year-old boy in his childhood home in New Plymouth in 1953.

Hinch identifies as an atheist.

Health 
In 2006, Hinch lost weight and his health declined. On 4 March 2007, he revealed on 60 Minutes he had been suffering from advanced cirrhosis of the liver, and that a tumour had been found on his liver. On 27 April 2007, Hinch returned to hospital for additional scans. On 4 August 2007, Hinch revealed he had inoperable liver cancer.

On 20 September 2010, Hinch confirmed the liver cancer diagnosis, and said that he expected to undergo surgery to remove a third of his liver, and that this would take him off-air for several weeks. Doctors gave him a 60 per cent chance of surviving a further five years. On 4 November 2010, Hinch told his listeners that his doctors had told him that without a liver transplant, his maximum survival would be 12 months.

On 6 July 2011, Hinch underwent liver transplant surgery at the Austin Hospital in Melbourne.

Published works 
The Scrabble Book (1972, rev. ed. 1977), 
Death at Newport (1986), 
AIDS – Most of the Questions, Some of the Answers (1987), 
Death in Paradise (1989), 
The Derryn Hinch Diet (1991), 
That's Life (1992), 
The Ultimate Guide to Winning Scrabble (2001), 
101 Ways To Lose Your Mobile Phone (2001), 
The Fall and Rise of Derryn Hinch: How I Hit the Wall and Didn't Bleed (2004), 
You are So Beautiful – The Passion and the Pain of Relationships (2006), 
I Beat the Booze and You Can Too (2009) 
Human Headlines: My 50 Years in the Media (2010) 
A Human Deadline – A Story of Life, Death, Hope and House Arrest (2012) 
Hinch vs Canberra: Behind the Human Headlines (2017) 
Unfinished Business: Life of a Senator (2020)

References

External links 

 Summary of parliamentary voting for Senator Derryn Hinch on TheyVoteForYou.org.au
 humanheadline.com.auOfficial Derryn Hinch web site 
 justiceparty.com.auOfficial Derryn Hinch's Justice Party web site
 Official Hinch Twitter account
 Derryn Hinch Biography, Information, etc ...
 
 
 
 3AW Hinch highlights
 Official Derryn Hinch old web site

1944 births
21st-century Australian politicians
3AW presenters
Australian atheists
Australian expatriates in the United States
Australian newspaper editors
Australian radio presenters
Australian reporters and correspondents
Australian Scrabble players
Australian talk radio hosts
Journalists from Melbourne
Living people
Members of the Australian Senate for Victoria
Members of the Australian Senate
Naturalised citizens of Australia
New Zealand atheists
New Zealand emigrants to Australia
New Zealand expatriates in Australia
New Zealand expatriates in the United States
New Zealand radio presenters
New Zealand television presenters
Newstalk ZB
Liver transplant recipients
People from New Plymouth
Radio personalities from Melbourne
Shock jocks
Sky News Australia reporters and presenters
People who lost New Zealand citizenship
Derryn Hinch's Justice Party members of the Parliament of Australia